This is a list of current and confirmed prospective destinations that SCAT Airlines and its subsidiaries Sunday Airlines and  Southern Sky are flying to, as of  .

Destinations 

Note - ''Green background indicates carriers active on given routes, grey background indicates terminated services.

Notes

References

Lists of airline destinations